Dionel Bellemare (March 25, 1880 – November 1, 1950) was a Canadian politician from Quebec.

Background

He was born on March 25, 1880 in Yamachiche, Mauricie and was a physician.

Mayor

Bellemare served as Mayor of Vaudreuil from 1931 to 1934.

Member of the legislature

Bellemare ran as a Conservative candidate in 1935 for the district of Vaudreuil and finished third with 27% of the vote.

He was elected as a Union Nationale candidate in 1936 with 43% of the vote.  He did not run in 1939.

Death

He died on November 1, 1950.

References

1880 births
1950 deaths
Dionel
Mayors of places in Quebec
Union Nationale (Quebec) MNAs